The Honda F-Series engine was considered Honda's "big block" SOHC inline four, though lower production DOHC versions of the F-series were built. It features a solid iron or aluminum open deck cast iron sleeved block and aluminum/magnesium cylinder head.

SOHC engines

F18A3
 Bore × Stroke: 
 Displacement: 
 Cylinder Configuration: Inline-4
 Valvetrain: SOHC, 16 valves
  up to 1997
  at 6,000 rpm,  at 4,000 rpm (PGM-FI-injection, Throttle-body fuel injection)
 Fuel consumption: 

This engine was also used in the Rover 618i, assembled in Swindon at the Honda facility.

F18B2
This engine was used for the Honda Accord European (CG8,CH6) from 1998 to 2002 VTEC S. Japan use variant (F18B) in (CD3,CF3) 1.8 VTS/VTE, from 1993 to 2002

The F18B2 won the 1.8L category of the International Engine of the Year competition for 2000.

Specifications
 Bore × Stroke: 
 Displacement: F18B2 
 Cylinder configuration: Inline-4
 Valvetrain: SOHC, 16 valves, VTEC + IAB system
 Compression ratio: 9.3:1
 Vtec active at 2,500 rpm
 IAB active at 4,000 rpm
 Max power: 
 at 6,100 rpm
  at 5,000 rpm

F20A
This engine series was used in the Accord, Ascot Innova and Prelude in Japan and Europe. The DOHC F20A was also derived from this engine (see below).

Specifications

 Bore × Stroke: 
 Displacement: 
 Cylinder configuration: Inline-4
 Compression ratio : 9.6:1
 Valvetrain: SOHC, 16 valves, non-VTEC
 Max Power :
F20A2  at 5,700 rpm (carbureted)
 F20A3  at 5,700 rpm (carbureted)
 F20A4  at 6,000 rpm (PGM-FI)
 F20A5  at 5,300 rpm (PGM-FI)
 F20A6  at 6,000 rpm (carbureted)
 F20A7  at 5,600 rpm (PGM-FI)
 F20A8  at 5,600 rpm (PGM-FI)
 Max Torque : 
 F20A2  at 3,500 rpm (carbureted)
 F20A3  at 3,800 rpm (carbureted)
 F20A4  at 3,700 rpm (PGM-FI)
 F20A5  at 5,000 rpm (PGM-FI)
 F20A6  at 3,500 rpm (carbureted)
 F20A7  at 4,400 rpm (PGM-FI)
 F20A8  at 4,800 rpm (PGM-FI)
 Fuel consumption F20A8 Urban -  Highway - 
 Fuel consumption (Japan Combined Cycle):  (PGM-FI),  (carbureted)

This engine also spawned many variants, according to market, but the specs remain largely similar.

The F20A5 is used in the CB3 and CB4 Chassis.

F20B3
Used in the Honda Accord Coupe (CD9) (1994-1997) 
and the Honda Accord Aerodeck (CE2) (Wagon) (1994-1997)
Produced for the Netherlands, Belgium, France, Germany, Switzerland and Luxembourg

All the models that came with the F20B3 had a 5 speed manual gearbox.

Specifications

 Bore × Stroke: 
 Displacement: 
 Valvetrain: SOHC, 16 valves 
 Cylinder configuration: Inline-4
 Fuel Delivery: Multi-port fuel injection
 Compression Ratio: 9.0:1
 Max Power:
 at 5,600 rpm
 Max Torque:
 at 4,500 rpm

F20Z1
This engine series is similar to the F20A above, used in the Honda Accord CC7 (1993-1996) and CE8 (1996-1998) in Europe. Also the Rover 620i (1993-1999)

Specifications
 Bore × Stroke: 
 Displacement: 
 Compression Ratio: 9.5:1
 Valvetrain: SOHC, 16 valves
  at 5,400 rpm

F20Z2
This engine is the low compression brother of F20Z1. This engine was used in the same models as the F20Z1.

Specifications
 Bore × Stroke: 
 Displacement: 
 Compression Ratio: 9.0:1
 Valve Configuration: SOHC, 16 valves
  at 5,300 rpm

F22A
This engine series was used in the Honda Accord and Honda Prelude S. Aside from differences in tuning, these engines are substantially similar.

Specifications
 Bore × Stroke: 
 Displacement: 
 Valve configuration: SOHC, 16 valves, non-VTEC
 Compression ratio: 8.8:1
 Max power:
F22A1:  at 5,200 rpm. (Accord DX, LX).
F22A2:  at 5,600 rpm. Accord EXi 2WS 1990–1993, Prelude S and SI 1992–1996. 2.2 Lts. water-cooled SOHC with Sequential multi-port fuel injection engine without catalytic converter (KT/KY). Compression Ratio 8.9:1. This engine is equipped with the same camshaft from F22A6 engine, have the 4-1 header and simple intake manifold from F22A1 without IABS. Built to be supplied for the Gulf Market models, be they Accord and Prelude, this is a reason which is very unknown in America, and there is not so much information.
F22A3:  European market engine, with more power due to less strict emission standards.
F22A4:  at 5,200 rpm. (Accord EX) The F22A4 is the same motor as the F22A1 but it has slightly more power due to a tubular designed header and slightly bigger exhaust piping.
F22A6:  at 5,600 rpm. The F22A6 is the same as the F22A1 except for a slightly more aggressive camshaft, a better flowing cast exhaust manifold, a different more aggressively tuned ECU (PT6), and a different intake manifold  that utilizes IAB's and also has a bigger plenum. The F22A6 also has a windage tray in the oil pan, and stiffer valve springs to accommodate the more aggressive camshaft.  In cars with an automatic transmission there is an oil cooler present on the back of the block as well.
F22A7:  European domestic market engine, with more power due to less strict emission standards. (uses PT4, obd1 ecu) .Compression ratio: 9.8:1.
F22A9 Australian delivered engine. Similar characteristics to the F22A6 European engine. More aggressive camshaft and slightly larger valves. Standard compression
F22A1:  at 4,000 rpm
F22A4:  at 4,000 rpm
F22A6:  at 4,500 rpm
F22A7:  at 5,000 rpm

F22B1

This engine was used in the 1994-1997 Honda Accord EX (1993 in JDM Accord models 2.2VTE, VTL & VTS) and the 1997 Acura CL.  It was the first F-series engine to feature VTEC.

Specifications
 Bore × Stroke: 
 Displacement: 
 Piston Length: 
 Compression Ratio: 8.8:1
 Rod Length: 
 Rod Diameter: 
 Pin Diameter: 
 Valvetrain: SOHC, 16 valves (4 valves per cylinder), VTEC
 Max Power:  at 5,500 rpm
 Max Torque:  at 4,500 rpm
 VTEC Switchover: 2300~3200 rpm (depending on manifold pressure)
 Redline: 6,500 rpm (fuel cut-off action)
 Firing order: 1-3-4-2
 Fuel control: (1994–1995) OBD-I PGM-FI (1996–1998) OBD-II PGM-FI

F22B5

This engine was used in the European Accord known as the Honda Aerodeck.

Specifications
 Bore × Stroke: 
 Displacement: 
 Piston Length: 
 Compression Ratio: 9.8:1
 Rod Length: 
 Rod Diameter: 
 Pin Diameter: 
 Valvetrain: SOHC, 16 valves (4 valves per cylinder)
 Max Power:  at 5,600-5,900 rpm
 Max Torque:  at 4,500-5,000 rpm
 Redline: 6,200 rpm
 Firing order: 1-3-4-2
 Fuel control: PGM-FI
 Fuel required: Premium unleaded gasoline (RON) of 95 or higher. (US equivalent of 91 octane)

F22B
The F22B2, F22B3, F22B6 and F22B8 are similar, though their exhaust headers vary between each.
Found in
Honda Accord DX, LX, SE, and Prelude 1993-1997
Honda Accord LXi 1994-1997 (Australia & New Zealand) (F22B3)
Honda Odyssey 1995-1997 (F22B6)
Honda Shuttle (F22B8)

Specifications
Displacement: 
Bore x Stroke: 
Valvetrain: SOHC
Head: SOHC, 16 valves
Compression: 8.8:1
Power:  at 5,300 rpm
Torque:  at 4,200 rpm
Redline: 6,300 rpm
Rev. limit: 6,900 rpm
Firing Order: 1-3-4-2
Fuel Control: OBD-I rarely OBD-II PGM-FI

F23A1
This engine was used in the 1998-2002 Honda Accord LX, EX, and SE, LEV models, and in the Acura 2.3CL in North America.

Acceleration 0- for the 4-cylinder models is improved (around the mid-9-second mark), with comparable fuel efficiency to its predecessor: /city and /hwy for LX and EX models with automatic transmissions. Emissions of Non-Methane Organic Gases (NMOG), also known as unburned hydrocarbons, produced during engine warm-up are considerably lower. The LX and EX engines produce less than 0.075 grams per mile, qualifying them for California LEV (Low-Emission Vehicle) status. In California, the Accord EX with the available automatic transmission will produce less than 0.03 grams per mile of NMOG, qualifying it as the first gasoline-powered vehicle to reach ULEV (Ultra-Low Emission Vehicle) status. The five-main bearing block is high-pressure die-cast from aluminum alloy. The walls of the block extend below the centerline of the crankshaft, which helps stiffen the bottom end. FEM (Finite Element Method) computer analysis was used to arrive at optimum thicknesses for the block ribs and walls in order to minimize engine vibration. Additional bottom-end rigidity comes from a larger, stronger bearing-cap beam that ties directly into the cylinder-block skirt. An aluminum-alloy stiffener has been added between the transmission case and the block, just behind the bearing carrier. The stiffener serves to tie the block and transmission together into a single, reinforced unit. FEM was also used to design this stiffener so that it would not only stiffen the area, but also help minimize high-frequency engine vibration. Finite-element analysis of the Accord's piston design by Honda engineers yielded a new ultra-short, lightweight skirt design, which is very rigid and resistant to vibration and piston slap. Like the V-6 engine the pistons are gravity-cast aluminum alloy and utilize full-floating wrist pins in order to minimize noise. The engine's drop-forged single-plane steel crankshaft and connecting rods have been designed to be stronger and operate with less friction, much like the V-6 components. The I-section, drop-forged steel connecting rods have a completely new design and are considerably lighter than their predecessors (475 g vs. 578 g), which helps to minimize vibration. Like the V-6 rod bolts, those of the 4-cylinder engine are torqued to the plastic region of the bolt material in order to ensure a solid union between the bearing cap and the connecting rod. The engine block incorporates the Honda-designed second-order balance system that cancels the inertial forces common to large-displacement 4-cylinder engines. Driven by a toothed belt, these balance shafts rotate in same directions at twice engine speed. Eccentric weights built into the shafts generate inertial forces that counteract the second-order forces created by the motion of the pistons and connecting rods. This Honda system minimizes vibration in the entire rpm range.

Cylinder Head

The 16-valve, single-overhead-camshaft cylinder head features four valves per cylinder and pentroof combustion chambers. Individual valves are smaller and lighter in 4-valve heads, which allows the engine to be revolved to a higher rpm, helping to extend the engine's power range. Valve actuation is via rocker arms and a hollow, belt-driven single overhead camshaft. The single-over-head-camshaft design requires less under-hood space than the more conventional dual overhead camshafts normally used with 16-valve, 4-cylinder engines. The adoption of a sophisticated knock control system optimizes ignition timing and allows for a higher compression ratio (9.3:1 from 8.8:1). Unleaded regular fuel is specified.

Revised Intake System

The intake system was simplified in shape to reduce induction resistance and noise. A larger twin-chambered air box designed to dampen resonant intake tract noise replaces the previous Accord's smaller, single-chamber damper. The new box is 10.7 liters in capacity, compared to the older unit's 8.2 liters. The larger box also eliminates the need for a second resonant-frequency damper and an additional side branch. The 2.3-liter Accord 4-cylinder engine intake manifold has been redesigned to add more power and lower emissions. The individual cast-aluminum runners have revised dimensions to better take advantage of the different air-flow characteristics of the 2.3-liter engine. A larger plenum chamber reduces induction noise and the incorporation of exhaust gas recirculation (EGR) ports into the plenum, upstream of the throttle plates, eliminates the need for a separate fitting and port in each intake runner.

Low vs. High Speed Operation

During low-rpm operation, only one intake valve (primary) opens, allowing air and fuel into the combustion chamber. The other intake valve (secondary) has only a slight amount of lift and its timing is staggered. As a result, the air-fuel charge drawn through the open intake valve undergoes a swirl effect. The swirl creates a stratified charge with a rich mixture near the spark plug for good light-off, and a progressively leaner mixture toward its periphery. This stratified charge, combined with improved EGR control, results in lower emissions especially during the critical warm-up period, and better fuel economy. Low-friction, roller-bearing rocker arms are used to help reduce friction and improve engine efficiency, except the secondary intake valve rocker arm does not have a roller-bearing. At high speed, as calculated by the ECU based on several inputs, a VTEC oil control valve is energized and oil pressure is routed to the small piston train in each 3 arm set of intake rocker arms. The pistons shift slightly which locks all three rocker arms together. Both intake valves then move together on the center rocker arm cam profile which changes intake valve timing and dwell and increases airflow into each cylinder. Springs in the piston train return the pistons back to their low rpm positions when the oil pressure is removed. Each center rocker arm is held against its cam lobe by an anti-free motion spring during low speed operation.

Emissions
 EX and LX engines qualify as California LEV (Low-Emission Vehicles)
 EX with automatic transmission qualifies as ULEV (Ultra-Low Emission Vehicle) in California
 Stratified-charge VTEC
 Electronically controlled EGR (Exhaust Gas Recirculation)
 ULEV engine uses 32-bit ECU with individual cylinder air-fuel ratio control, lean air-fuel ratio during fast idle, high-efficiency catalyst and low heat-mass exhaust system

NVH
 Less radiated noise and vibration
 Quieter, less restrictive induction system with large, twin-chamber resonator
 New lightweight piston and connecting-rod design minimizes vibration
 More rigid crankshaft design
 Second-order balance system
 Redesigned cylinder block is more rigid with less vibration
 Aluminum engine stiffener between engine and transmission

Transmission
 Direct-control automatic transmission is controlled by PCM (Powertrain Control Module) for smooth shifting
 Cruise control is controlled by PCM and AT Cruise ECU for smoother operation
 Reduced gear noise
 Manual transmission has reduced lining diameter for smoother shifting, with same level of fade resistance and durability

Valve Operation

Specifications
 2.3L MFI 4CYL
 Bore × Stroke: 
 Displacement: 
 Valve Configuration: SOHC, 16 valves, VTEC
 Compression ratio: 9.3:1
 Max power:  at 5,700 rpm
 Max torque:  at 4,900 rpm

F23A4
This engine was used in the 1998-2002 Honda Accord ULEV models. This engine has a different exhaust manifold, a more restrictive intake manifold, and a 32-bit ECU that uses an AFR (Air Fuel Ratio) oxygen sensor when compared to the F23A1.

F23A5
This engine was used in the 1998-2002 Honda Accord DX, the 1998-2002 Honda Accord LXi in New Zealand and the 2002 Honda Accord LX VP (value package) in North America.

Specifications
 Bore × Stroke: 
 Displacement: 
 Valve Configuration: SOHC, 16 valves
 Compression ratio: 8.8:1
 Max power:  at 5,500 rpm
 Max torque:  at 4,500 rpm

F23A7
This engine was substantially similar to the F23A1.  It was used in the 1998 Honda Odyssey, the 1998-1999 Isuzu Oasis, and EUDM Honda Shuttle.

Bore . Compression ratio: 9.3:1

F23Z5
This engine was used in the Honda Accord sixth (CL3 - Europe) (2001-2003).

Bore . Compression ratio: 9.3:1
 Max power:  at 5,700 rpm
 Max torque:  at 4,900 rpm

DOHC engines

F20A
This engine was used in the 1990–1993 CB3 and CB4 Honda Accord 2.0Si, Honda Prelude Si - SR JDM-EDM and Honda Ascot Innova.

Specifications
 Bore × Stroke: 
 Displacement: 
 Valve Configuration: DOHC, 16 valves
 Compression ratio: 9.5:1
 Max power:  at 6,100 rpm
 Max torque:  at 5,000 rpm

F20B 
This engine series was used in the 1997-2001 CF4, CF5, CF9, CL3 Honda Accord and Honda Torneo from Japan. It uses a DOHC VTEC cylinder head similar to the H22A found in the Prelude but was designed to comply with many countries' sub-2.0 liter tax. The automatic transmission versions received the lower hp version , as it was tuned for more mid-range torque than its manual transmission counterpart. The F20B manual version also utilized bigger cams, intake and throttle body from the H22 type S.

Specifications
 Accord SiR, SiR-T F20B 1997-2001 2.0L
 Valve train: four-cylinder, DOHC VTEC, 16-valve
 Bore × Stroke: 
 Displacement: 
 Torque: at 6,600 rpm (manual models); at 5,500 rpm (automatic models);
 Horsepower: at 7,200 rpm (manual models);  at 7,000 rpm (automatic models)
 VTEC Engagement: 5,600 rpm
 Redline: 7,400 rpm
 Rev limit: 7,800 rpm
 Compression: 11.0:1
 Fuel control: OBD-2b

F20C

This engine was a radical departure from previous F engines, and only shared basic dimensions such as bore spacing.  It was designed specifically for the Honda S2000 and shares some engineering with the Honda K engine.  A long-stroke F22C1 variant was also produced.

Specifications
 Year: 2000+
 Bore x Stroke: 
 Displacement: 
 Compression: 11.5:1; 11.7:1 (Japan-spec)
 Power:  at 8,300 rpm
 Torque:  at 7,000 rpm
 Redline: 9,000 rpm
 VTEC Engagement: 6,000 rpm

F22C1
This engine was a reworked version of the F20C, having a new rod stroke ratio and the redline was dropped to 8,000 rpm to produce better low end torque. The camshafts were also revised along with valve spring and retainers. All these changes increased the peak torque by 6%, however the power output stayed the same.

Specifications
Year: 2004-2009
 Bore x Stroke: 
Displacement: 
Compression: 11.1:1
Power:  at 7,800 rpm
 Torque:  at 7,000 rpm
 Redline: 8,200 rpm
 VTEC Engagement: 6,000 rpm

F22B 

This engine was used in the mk4 1992–1996 Honda Prelude Si in Japan. It is similar to the H23A.
The mk5 1997 Honda Prelude also used this engine in first years of manufacture sold as Si only in Japan.

Specifications
 Bore × Stroke: 
 Displacement: 
 Valve Configuration: DOHC, 16 valves
 Compression ratio: 9.3:1
 Max power:  at 6,500 rpm
 Max torque:  at 6,000 rpm
 Redline: 6,800 rpm

References

F engine
1989 introductions
Straight-four engines
Gasoline engines by model